The Bathurst-class corvettes were a ship class of sixty vessels built in Australia during World War II and initially operated by the Royal Australian Navy (RAN), the British Admiralty (although the ships were crewed by and commissioned into the RAN) and the Royal Indian Navy. Following the conclusion of World War II, many of the ships were sold or transferred to other organisations, and saw service in the Royal Navy, Royal Netherlands Navy, Royal New Zealand Navy, Indonesian Navy, Turkish Navy, Pakistan Navy and civilian service.

This list is divided into two sections. The first section, Primary service, lists the sixty vessels during their initial period of service, up until their decommissioning. Secondary service lists any vessels which later served in other navies, entered civilian service, or were recommissioned into the RAN for training purposes.

Primary service
36 of the Bathurst class were constructed for and crewed by the Royal Australian Navy (RAN). All of the four corvettes lost during activities related to World War II are in this group.

20 Bathurst-class ships were constructed for the British Admiralty, but were crewed by and commissioned into the Royal Australian Navy.

4 Bathurst-class corvettes were constructed for the Royal Indian Navy (RIN). On 15 August 1947, India gained independence from the British Empire. After this date, the navy was referred to as the Indian Navy, and the prefix of all ships was changed from HMIS to INS.

Secondary service

Citations
Unless indicated here, all information is taken from each ship's corresponding Ship History page on the Sea Power Centre website.

References
 
 

Bathurst class corvette